Prrenjas (also written Përrenjas) is a town and a municipality in Elbasan County, eastern Albania. The municipality was formed at the 2015 local government reform by the merger of the former municipalities Prrenjas, Qukës, Rrajcë and Stravaj, that became municipal units. The seat of the municipality is the town Prrenjas. The total population is 24,906 (2011 census), in a total area of 323.17 km2. The population of the former municipality at the 2011 census was 5,847.

History 
The history of the creation of the city Prrenjas dates back a long time.
In the period of the Ottoman Albanian wars, the area where the city rises was called Torviolli. The native hero, Gjergj Kastrioti Skanderbeg, before heading for battle (the battle is known in history as Battle of Torvioll) told to his fighters, that the battle must be won. A significant history has been written here.

The name of the town of Prrenjas is closely related to the same battle that the Skanderbeg army won. Many Turkish and Albanian soldiers were killed. There were so many soldiers killed that is believed to have been flowing a river of blood.

Prrenjas is also famous for being connected to the Via Egnatia road that stretched from Istanbul all the way on to Durrës. The people of Prrenjas also participated in the Albanian Declaration of Independence in the 28 of November 1912.

Historical Places
Via Egnatia
Skanderbeg's Table
Domosdova field (where the Battle of Torvioll took place)

Points of Interest
Shebenik-Jabllanice National Park
Skanderbeg's Table
Statue of Miners
Abandoned mine of Prrenjas

Transportation

Bus
There are buses in Prrenjas that can take you in other cities in Albania and other countries.

Trains
There is no train line that can goes to or from Prrenjas.
Elbasan-Pogradec extension has been closed

Highways
The only main road in Prrenjas is the SH3 (State Road 3) that starts in Tirana and ends in Korçë and passes by Prrenjas.

Sports
Prrenjas favourite city sport is football. The main soccer team KF Domozdova founded in 1923 disbanded in 2018 due to financial problems. Following the disbandment of the football club, the city stadium was demolished to make way for the construction of the new city center.

Notable people
Halit Berzeshta, physician and activist of the Albanian National Awakening
Qybra Sokoli, partisan during the War of Liberation

References

 
Municipalities in Elbasan County
Administrative units of Prrenjas
Towns in Albania